Ponnuchami is a 1993 Indian Malayalam-language drama film directed by Ali Akbar and written by A. R. Mukesh, starring Suresh Gopi and Chithra.

Plot

Ponnuchami is a farrier, is assisted by an apprentice he adopted from the streets who is deaf and dumb Ranjappan. In the meantime, he marries a woman and has a child who is not walking despite many treatments, where as an astrologer tells him that it's because of a curse that his child is not walking on two legs, he then sees a doctor in a hospital where he is told that it is curable; when returning from hospital he sees his wife raped by Ranjappan. Upon seeing this, he decided to leave his wife, taking the boy with him, the day after he sees that Ranjappan has committed suicide out of guilt.

Years later he comes back to his home with his child now cured and able to walk, but with his wife he sees the child she had with his apprentice who is also deaf and dumb. He embraces them all and accepts life's fate.

Cast
 Suresh Gopi as Ponnuchammi
 Ashokan as Rajappan
 Vinodini as Maya
 Chithra as Kanakam
 Thodupuzha Vasanthi as Narayani
 Indrans as Velappan
 Mansoor Ali Khan as Ratnam
 Lalitha Sree as Mallika	
 Kalpana as Vally
 Sainuddin as Aravindakshan
 Adoor Bhavani as Pathamavathi
 Jose Pellissery

Soundtrack

The songs of this movie was composed by Mohan Sithara and penned by O.N.V Kurup.

References

External links
 

1993 films
1990s Malayalam-language films